The Legislature of Río Negro Province is the unicameral legislative body of Río Negro Province, in Argentina. It convenes in the provincial capital, Viedma.

It comprises 46 legislators, 22 of whom are elected in a single province-wide multi-member district, while the remaining 24 are elected in eight three-member districts that divide the province's territory, called "electoral circuits" (circuitos electorales). Its powers and responsibilities are established in the provincial constitution.

Elections to the legislature take place every four years, when the entirety of its members are renewed. The legislature is presided by the Vice Governor of Río Negro, who is elected alongside the governor every four years.

History
The Legislature was established in 1958, when the National Territory of Río Negro became a province of Argentina. The first legislature convened in the old building of the Teatro Argentino, in Viedma. In 1972, the military governor, Roberto Requeijo, ordered a series of renovations to better accommodate the legislature in the site of the Teatro Argentino.

Electoral districts
Legislators in both the province-wide district and the eight electoral circuits are elected through proportional representation using party-list proportional representation, with D'Hondt system and a 5% electoral threshold. The electoral circuits do not correspond to the province's departments, but are rather divided using municipalities as its main criterion.

The electoral circuits were first introduced ahead of the 1958 provincial elections, originally comprising six districts. The current distribution was established in 2013, when the electoral law was last modified.

References

External links
 
Constitution of Río Negro Province 

1958 establishments in Argentina
Politics of Argentina
Río Negro Province
Río Negro